Jorat-Menthue is a municipality in the district Gros-de-Vaud in the canton of Vaud in Switzerland.

The municipalities of Villars-Tiercelin, Montaubion-Chardonney, Sottens, Villars-Mendraz and Peney-le-Jorat merged on 1 July 2011 into the new municipality of Jorat-Menthue.

History
Montaubion-Chardonney is first mentioned in 1200 as in Monte Albeonis.  In 1223 Montaubion was mentioned as Montalbium and in 1223 Chardonney was mentioned as Chardenai.  Sottens is first mentioned in 1147 as Sotens.  Peney-le-Jorat is first mentioned around 1141-43 as Pinoy.

Geography
Of this area,  or 56.8% is used for agricultural purposes, while  or 36.1% is forested.

Historic Population
The historical population is given in the following chart:

Heritage sites of national significance

The Emetteur National De Sottens (Sottens transmitter) is listed as a Swiss heritage site of national significance.

The Sottens Transmitter is the nationwide transmitter for the French-speaking Radio Suisse Romande.  It is easily receivable during the night throughout the whole of Europe.

Weather
Villars-Tiercelin has an average of 130.4 days of rain or snow per year and on average receives  of precipitation. During this month there is precipitation for an average of 10.9 days. The month with the most days of precipitation is May, with an average of 13.4, but with only  of rain or snow.

References

Municipalities of the canton of Vaud